Pagasa fusca is a species of damsel bug in the family Nabidae. It is found in Central America, North America, and South America.

Subspecies
These two subspecies belong to the species Pagasa fusca:
 Pagasa fusca fusca (Stein, 1857)
 Pagasa fusca nigripes Harris, 1926

References

Further reading

 

Nabidae
Articles created by Qbugbot
Insects described in 1857